Time and Free Will: An Essay on the Immediate Data of Consciousness (French: Essai sur les données immédiates de la conscience) is Henri Bergson's doctoral thesis, first published in 1889. The essay deals with the problem of free will, which Bergson contends is merely a common confusion among philosophers caused by an illegitimate translation of the unextended into the extended, as a means of introducing his theory of duration, which would become highly influential among continental philosophers in the following century.

Editions
 Henri Bergson, Time and Free Will: An Essay on the Immediate Data of Consciousness, Dover Publications 2001, .

See also
 Immediate experience

External links
 1910 English translation of Time and Free Will
 Multiple formats at the Internet Archive

1889 non-fiction books
Philosophy books
Works by Henri Bergson